Iona Banks (20 December 1920 – 20 May 2008) was a Welsh actress from Trelogan, Sir y Fflint. She played Mrs. Roberts in Our Day Out (1977), Mrs Roberts in Part 2 of Willy Russell's 1983 TV series One Summer and barmaid Gwladys Lake in the Welsh television soap opera Pobol y Cwm.

References

External links
 
 BBC (English) notice of death of Iona Banks

1920 births
2008 deaths
Welsh film actresses
Welsh soap opera actresses